Killipia is a genus of flowering plants belonging to the family Melastomataceae. It is now a synonym of Miconia .

It is native range was Colombia to Ecuador.

The former genus name of Killipia was in honour of Ellsworth Paine Killip (1890–1968), an English painter and illustrator.
It was first published in Bull. Torrey Bot. Club 52: 456 in 1925.

References

Melastomataceae
Melastomataceae genera
Historically recognized angiosperm genera